Hemandradenia mannii is a species of plant in the family Connaraceae. It is found in Cameroon, Central African Republic, the Republic of the Congo, the Democratic Republic of the Congo, Ivory Coast, Equatorial Guinea, Gabon, Ghana, and Nigeria. It is threatened by habitat loss.

References

Connaraceae
Flora of Cameroon
Flora of the Central African Republic
Flora of the Republic of the Congo
Flora of the Democratic Republic of the Congo
Flora of Ivory Coast
Flora of Equatorial Guinea
Flora of Gabon
Flora of Ghana
Flora of Nigeria
Near threatened flora of Africa
Taxonomy articles created by Polbot